Pietro Style is the second album from German singer Pietro Lombardi, it was released on December 2, 2011 in Germany. The first single released from the album "Goin' to L.A." was released on November 11, 2011.

Singles
 "Goin' to L.A." was the first single released from the album. It was released on November 11, 2011. The song reached number 22 in Germany and number 55 in Austria.

Track listing

Chart performance

Release history

References

2011 albums
Pietro Lombardi (singer) albums